Hey, Hey, Hey, It's Fat Albert is an animated primetime television special which originally aired on November 12, 1969, on NBC in the United States. While NBC did re-air the special twice following its initial airing, it has rarely been seen since. The film is in the collection of the Paley Center for Media, which has only held a very small number of screenings of the feature. It was created by Bill Cosby and animator Ken Mundie. It was based on Cosby's stand-up routines, which were based on his childhood. It would later inspire the long-running 1972 animated series Fat Albert and the Cosby Kids. A second special, Weird Harold, aired on May 4, 1973.

The special has a very different style from the later series. Due to time and a tight budget, the animators had to draw directly onto cels with grease pencils and actual images of Philadelphia were used for backgrounds. The music was provided by Herbie Hancock, who later used some of the music he composed on his album Fat Albert Rotunda. Unlike the later Cosby Kids series and specials, it has not been released on DVD.

References

External links
 Article featuring concept art and a short clip

1969 in American television
1969 television specials
1960s American television specials
American animated television films
American television series premieres
Filmation animated films
1960s animated television specials
Works by Bill Cosby